Transparency International Canada  is the Canadian division of Transparency International, a global anti-corruption non-government coalition. It  looks at global corruption and offers legal reforms to fight it. It claims that compared to other advanced countries, Canada's transparency laws are weak.

Administration
Paul Lalonde is chair and president of Transparency International Canada.

Background
TIC claims that  lack of ownership disclosure makes Canada's real estate market attractive for the investment the proceeds of crime, and that the lack of disclosure in property ownership facilitate tax evasion.  It claims this is   a growing problem  gone mostly  unpunished in Canada.

Real estate
In Transparency International Canada's 2017 report on their 2016 investigation, "No Reason to Hide: Unmasking the anonymous owners of Canadian companies and trusts", it was revealed "that no one really knew who owned almost half of Vancouver’s most valuable properties, as the true owners were hiding behind shell companies, trusts and nominee owners." The report suggested that  lawyers are often used to launder money in Canada and that almost half of Vancouver's 100 most expensive homes were bought using methods that obscure the identity of the buyer. Research by TIC showed that between 29 and half of the 100 most valuable residential properties in the Greater Vancouver area are owned using methods that obscure the identity of the buyer, and that four are registered in offshore jurisdictions. TIC recommends that the Canadian federal government should require all companies and trusts in the country to identify their beneficial owners, and publish the collected information in a registry that is accessible to the public.

Corruption Perception Index
Canada is ranked number nine on the Transparency International's annual Corruption Perceptions Index.

OECD Anti-Bribery Convention

In September 2018, Transparency International downgraded Canada to "limited" enforcement of its obligations under the OECD Anti-Bribery Convention. It was previously ranked as "moderate". This new lower ranking places Canada in the same category as "Hungary, Greece and Argentina" and "two levels out of four below international leaders such as the United States and the U.K."

References

External links
http://www.transparencycanada.ca

Political advocacy groups in Canada
Legal advocacy organizations based in Canada
Legal organizations based in Ontario
Organizations based in Toronto